Brekstad is a town in the municipality of Ørland in Trøndelag county, Norway. It is located along the Trondheimsfjord at the entrance to the Stjørnfjorden.

The  town has a population (2021) of 2,311.  Brekstad received town status on 8 October 2005, thus becoming the 95th town in Norway.
 
The major employers in Brekstad are Ørland Main Air Station / Ørland Airport, Mascot Høie linen factory, Coop Fosen, and Tine Midt-Norge. Brekstad hosted the Fosen District Court before it was merged with the Trøndelag District Court in 2021. The Ørland Church and Ørland cultural center are both located in the town.

Brekstad has connections with the Kystekspressen boat to Trondheim, Hitra, Frøya (via bus), Lensvik, Hysnes and Kristiansund. The Brekstad–Valset Ferry has regular service across the Trondheimsfjord from Brekstad to Valset in Orkland. There are also road connections to elsewhere in Ørland.

History
Brekstad post office was established in 1883. Brekstad is also the site of Skjeggehaugen, from the Old Norse word haugr meaning mound.

Shopping and business services
Brekstad in Ørland is a regional center for both shopping and business services. In the city of Brekstad shoppers can visit and enjoy several clothing stores, grocery stores, cafes, lumber & hardware stores, goldsmiths, flower shop, convenience stores, sports stores, gift stores, restaurants, optometry store, health food store, drug store, Asian grocery store, bookshop, banks, office supply, pet supplies, paint store, art galleries, furniture store, bakeries, car dealers and liquor store.

Business services like accountants, attorneys, banks, consultants, advertising agencies, office supplies, auditing, print shops, collection agency and office services are readily available.

Media gallery

References

External links
Brekstad Travel Guide

Ørland
Cities and towns in Norway
Populated places in Trøndelag